Cuba competed at the 2010 Summer Youth Olympics, the inaugural Youth Olympic Games, held in Singapore from 14 August to 26 August 2010.

Medalists

Athletics

Boys
Track and Road Events

Field Events

Girls
Track and Road Events

Field Events

Boxing

Boys

Canoeing

Boys

Diving

Boys

Fencing

Group Stage

Knock-Out Stage

Gymnastics

Artistic Gymnastics

Boys

Judo

Individual

Team

Modern pentathlon

Rowing

Sailing

One Person Dinghy

Taekwondo

Triathlon

Girls

Mixed

Volleyball

Weightlifting

Wrestling

Freestyle

Greco-Roman

References

External links
http://www.escambray.cu/Eng/Sport/cuba1008171113
Competitors List: Cuba – Singapore 2010 official site
 Schedule/Results – Singapore 2010 official site

Nations at the 2010 Summer Youth Olympics
Summer Youth Olympics
Cuba at the Youth Olympics